is a side-scrolling shooter RPG video game developed by Omiya Soft and published by Squaresoft, and was released in Japan on February 23, 1996 for the Super Famicom game console. The game is the second entry in the Front Mission series. Unlike most other Front Mission entries in the series, Gun Hazard doesn't follow a turn-based strategy gameplay style, but rather is a side-scrolling shooter with RPG elements.

Gameplay
Gun Hazard is the first action RPG of the Front Mission series, and it is similar to Metal Warriors and Assault Suit Valken. As a side-scrolling shooter spin-off, the gameplay of Gun Hazard differs from the tactical role-playing game entries of the numbered Front Mission titles. Rather than being played out on a grid-based map and using a turn-based structure, battles takes place in real-time on scrolling 2D maps akin to Assault Suits Valken (titled Cybernator outside of Japan), a game which shared several key development staff with Gun Hazard. The player controls one character who pilots a bipedal mech known as a wanzer.

Game progression in Gun Hazard is done in linear manner: watch cut-scene events, complete missions, set up wanzers and vehicles during intermissions, and sortie for the next mission. The player travels to locations on a point-and-click world map.

In Gun Hazard, the player can leave the mech and explore.

A unique feature of Gun Hazard is its usage-based progression system. The usefulness of parts and weapons increases with prolonged usage; the more they are used in missions, the more effective they become.

Story
Set in 2064, the story of Gun Hazard takes place all over the world in an alternate Front Mission universe. In the early 21st century, nations around the world fought over the control of natural resources. With natural resources dwindling in supply, the nations of the world eventually banded together to seek a solution to the growing crisis. Realizing the potential in space-based energy, they began development of an orbital elevator known as "Atlas" in 2024. As the orbital elevator's completion drew near, a breakthrough was achieved in miniature fusion reactors. The countries responsible for Atlas began to halt development of the orbital elevator and pursued miniature fusion reactor technology. Left unfinished, Atlas became a symbol of failed dreams and hopes as the world regressed back into a world of conflicts. One such conflict is the Bergen coup d'état in 2064.

Plot
The plot of Gun Hazard revolves around a soldier based in Bergen, Norway named Albert Grabner (whose parents reside Eningen, Germany). In January 2064, Ark Hellbrand of the Bergen Army stages a coup d'état in an attempt to overthrow the government led by President Moss Orwen. As the coup d'état forces begin to take over the country, President Orwen radios for assistance from NORAD and a faction of the Bergen Army loyal to him. Albert Grabner is sent to act as the president's bodyguard and helps him escape the country. However, the two are eventually captured by Hellbrand. Albert escapes from prison with the help of Brenda Lockheart, a mercenary employed by the Kernelight Association. Upon escaping Bergen and reaching New York City, they visit the Kernelight Association headquarters. Hoping to return to Bergen and rescue Orwen, Albert agrees to working for the Kernelight Association to find allies that can help him overthrow Ark. As the two work for the mercenary guild and travel to war-torn countries around the world, Albert begins to see a link between the civil conflicts, the Bergen coup d'état, and an organization only known as "The Society".

Development and release
The game was developed by Omiya Soft, which had some members from Masaya, developer of Assault Suits Valken. Gun Hazard is the first spin-off entry and the second entry overall in the Front Mission series. The game takes place in a completely separate universe from the other Front Mission games.

Gun Hazard was unveiled at a Square of Japan press conference in early September 1995. It was released in Japan and published by Squaresoft, on February 23, 1996 for the Super Famicom game console. Front Mission Series: Gun Hazard sold over 184,000 copies in Japan by the end of 1996, and 300,000 copies in Japan in total.

It was also released on the Japanese Wii's Virtual Console service on May 20, 2008. The game later received an unofficial fan translation into English by the group Aeon Genesis.

Music

The game's soundtrack was composed by Nobuo Uematsu and Yasunori Mitsuda, with additional tracks provided by Junya Nakano and Masashi Hamauzu. The soundtrack was the second collaboration between Nobuo Uematsu and Yasunori Mitsuda, after Chrono Trigger the previous year. According to Uematsu, Mitsuda worked so much on the soundtrack that he eventually had to be hospitalized.

The soundtrack has a "mechanical" theme to its music, and incorporates both electronic and traditional instruments. The music from the game was released on an album titled Front Mission Series: Gun Hazard Original Sound Track. It was released by NTT Publishing on February 25, 1996. Kero Hazel of Square Enix Music Online called the soundtrack album "a thumping example of fine industrial music" and complimented its use of other musical styles to influence that core style. Patrick Gann of RPGFan also praised the album as "downright awesome" and highly recommended it.

After the end credits, a voice sample quietly appears. This voice sample is from the uncensored version of the 1994 song "Dog Tribe" by UK hip hop group Fun-Da-Mental.

Reception 

Famitsu gave it a score of 28 out of 40.

UK magazine Super Play gave it a score of 45 out of 100.

Super GamePower gave it a 4.2 out of 5.

Fun Generation gave it a 7 out of 10.

In 2016, Nintendo Life gave it a score of 8/10.

Notes

References

External links
Front Mission Series: Gun Hazard at Square-Enix.com 

1996 video games
Front Mission
Japan-exclusive video games
Video games about mecha
Military science fiction video games
Super Nintendo Entertainment System games
Video games developed in Japan
Video games set in Norway
Video games set in New York City
Video games scored by Junya Nakano
Video games scored by Masashi Hamauzu
Video games scored by Nobuo Uematsu
Video games scored by Yasunori Mitsuda
Virtual Console games
Video games set in the 2060s